The women's foil competition of the fencing events at the 2015 Southeast Asian Games is being held on 3 June 2015 at the OCBC Arena Hall 2 in Kallang, Singapore.

Schedule

Results

Pool round

Knockout round

Final standing

References

Women's foil
Women's sports competitions in Singapore
South